On the Road with Ellison Volume Six is the latest report from Harlan Ellison and a life lived on the road. This 2-CD set features an exclusive new essay and Harlan’s historic 2005 Grand Master Award acceptance speech. Volume Six finds the author impersonating a rabbi, getting kicked out of Brazil, offering his thoughts on Star Wars and saying goodbye to his dear friend Octavia Butler. Follow Harlan on the road and get inside the head of America's most outspoken wordsmith. This is Ellison live on stage and anything goes.

Track listing

Disc one
Magellan and I Take Tea at the Roxy
Neither Harry S. Truman nor David O. Selznik Had a Middle Name
The Finest Man Who Ever Lived, Anywhere, Anytime
Oh, Oh, Oblivion!
I Babysat Peter David's 9 Year Old Daughter, Caroline Helen Helen 
Serial Killers Are Just Doughnuts
Notes on My Flirtation with Higher Education, or, Taken to the Shedd
The Charnel House, the Rotting Swamp, and the Abattoir
What Decade Is This?
Blahblahblahblah&blah
I AM NOT Now, Nor Have I Ever Been Rabbi Rosenthal
Get Outta Town Now, Gringo Muthuhfugguh!
An Edge In My Voice: Installment #54 - How To Make Life Interesting

Disc two
2005 Nebula Grandmaster Award: Neil Gaiman introduction
Harlan's Grandmaster Acceptance Speech
In Memoriam: Octavia E. Butler

References
 Fingerprints on the Sky: The Authorized Harlan Ellison Bibliography, Richmond, T. (2017). Edgeworks Abbey/Subterranean Press.

External links
Deep Shag Records listing for the album
All Music Guide

2012 live albums
Harlan Ellison albums
Deep Shag Records albums
2010s spoken word albums
Spoken word albums by American artists
Live spoken word albums